"" ("National Anthem") is the national anthem of Tajikistan, officially adopted on 7 September 1994.

History
Upon its independence from the Soviet Union in 1991, Tajikistan retained the Soviet-era regional anthem, lyrics and all, as its national anthem for a time before replacing the lyrics in 1994. This was in contrast to other former Soviet states like Turkmenistan and Kazakhstan that appropriated their old Soviet-era regional anthems as national ones but did so without the Soviet lyrics.

The lyrics were written by Gulnazar Keldi, and the music composed by Suleiman Yudakov was the same melody from the "State Anthem of the Tajik Soviet Socialist Republic".

Lyrics

Notes

References

External links
Tajikistan: Surudi Milli - Audio of the national anthem of Tajikistan, with information and lyrics (archive link)
Himnuszok - A vocal version of the Anthem with the current lyrics, featured in Szbszig's "Himnuszok" website.
Vocal of "Surudi Milli" with Soviet lyrics
MIDI file

National anthems
National symbols of Tajikistan
Tajikistani music
National anthem compositions in A minor